In linear algebra, the Householder operator  is defined as follows. Let  be a finite dimensional inner product space with inner product  and unit vector . Then
 
is defined by

It is also common to choose a non-unit vector , and normalize it directly in the Householder operator's expression

Properties 
The Householder operator satisfies the following properties:

 it is linear ; if  is a vector space over a field , then

 self-adjoint
 if , it is orthogonal ; otherwise, if  it is unitary.

Special cases 

Over a real or complex vector space, the Householder operator is also known as the Householder transformation.

References

Numerical linear algebra